Euryestola is a genus of longhorn beetles of the subfamily Lamiinae.

 Euryestola antennalis Breuning, 1940
 Euryestola caraca Galileo & Martins, 1997
 Euryestola castanea Galileo & Martins, 2001
 Euryestola freyi Breuning, 1955
 Euryestola iquira Galileo & Martins, 1997
 Euryestola morotinga Galileo & Martins, 1997
 Euryestola murupe Galileo & Martins, 1997

References

Calliini
Cerambycidae genera